Krische is a German language surname. It stems from a reduced form of the male given name Christian. Notable people with the name include:

Joseph Krische, former U.S. soccer defender
Michael J. Krische (1966), American chemist

References 

German-language surnames
Surnames from given names